Extreme Love: Dementia is a 2012 British documentary film by Louis Theroux.

The documentary is the second part of Theroux's Extreme Love, following Extreme Love: Autism.

Theroux travels to the city of Phoenix, Arizona, considered the capital of dementia care, spending time at Beatitudes, a residential institution for those with dementia. Theroux also meets individuals in the Phoenix area who are trying to keep relationships alive with loved ones with dementia as their disease progresses. Theroux also addresses the case of Early-onset Alzheimer's, presenting the case of Selinda Hope Border, a 49-year-old mother who had been diagnosed with dementia. Selinda died on 24 January 2018 at the age of 56 as a result of such illness.

References

External links 
 
 

Louis Theroux's BBC Two specials
BBC television documentaries
2012 television specials
Documentary films about dementia
Films set in Phoenix, Arizona
Healthcare in Arizona
British television films
Television episodes set in Arizona
BBC travel television series